Berović is a surname traditionally used in Croatia, Serbia, Montenegro and Bosnia and Herzegovina. It may refer to:

Đorđe Berović (1845–1897), Ottoman Serb official
Maya Berović (born 1987), Bosnian pop singer
Berović Beton (Construction Company)
Radivoje Berović (1900–1975), Serbian academic
Filip Berović (fl. 1850), diplomat and merchant
Petar Berović (1797–1871),
Đakomo Berović,
Joso Berović,
Rade Berović, Serbian master builder

See also
Berić

Perović

Serbian surnames
Bosnian surnames